Comandante Faà di Bruno, also referred to by its shortened name Faà di Bruno, was a  built for the Royal Italian Navy (Regia Marina) in the 1930s. It was sunk in 1940 by British and Canadian destroyers escorting a convoy.

Design and description
The Marcello-class submarines were designed as improved versions of the preceding . They displaced  surfaced and  submerged.

For surface running, the boats were powered by two  diesel engines, each driving one propeller shaft. When submerged each propeller was driven by a  electric motor. They could reach  on the surface and  underwater.

The boats were armed with eight internal  torpedo tubes, four each in the bow and stern. One reload were stowed for each tube, which gave them a total of sixteen torpedoes. They were also armed with two  guns and four  machine guns for combat on the surface.

Construction and career

See also
Italian submarines of World War II

Notes

References
 

uboat.net Comandante Faà di Bruno (FB, I.5) Faà di Bruno Accessed 2 May 2022

External links
 Faa di Bruno at regiamarina.net
 Comandante Faà di Bruno Marina Militare website

Marcello-class submarines
Ships built by OTO Melara
Ships built in La Spezia
Lost submarines of Italy
World War II shipwrecks in the Atlantic Ocean
1939 ships
Maritime incidents in November 1940
Submarines sunk by Canadian warships
Submarines sunk by British warships